Rębielak,  also Rebeliak or Rembeliak is a Polish-language surname. Notable people with this surname include:

Janusz Rębielak (born 1955), Polish architect and engineer
Rick Rembielak, American college baseball coach
 (1899-1970), Polish highly decorated military man

Polish-language surnames